General election to the Legislative Assembly of Delhi for all 70 constituencies is scheduled to be held in or before February 2025.

Background
The previous Assembly elections were held in February 2020. After the election, the Aam Aadmi Party formed the state government, with Arvind Kejriwal becoming Chief Minister for a third term. The tenure of Delhi Legislative Assembly is scheduled to end on 15 February 2025.

Schedule

Parties and Alliances







References

State Assembly elections in Delhi
Delhi